Barbara Newhall Follett (March 4, 1914 – disappeared December 7, 1939) was an American child prodigy novelist. Her first novel, The House Without Windows, was published in January 1927, when she was twelve years old. Her next novel, The Voyage of the Norman D., received critical acclaim when she was fourteen.

In December 1939, aged 25, Follett reportedly became depressed with her marriage and walked out of her apartment, never to be seen again.

Early life 
Barbara Newhall Follett was born in Hanover, New Hampshire, on 4 March 1914, to Wilson Follett, a literary editor, critic and university lecturer, and children's writer Helen Thomas Follett. She had an elder half-sister, named Grace, from her father's first marriage, as well as a younger sister, Sabra Follett, later Sabra Follett Meservey — the first woman to be admitted as a graduate student to Princeton University, in 1961. Schooled at home by her mother, Barbara showed an early aptitude for reading and writing, as she began to write her own poetry by the age of four. Barbara was an imaginative and intelligent child: by age seven she had begun to put to paper her own imaginary world, Farksolia, and to develop its language, Farksoo. Somewhat a child of nature, Barbara's stories and poems often dealt with the natural world and the wilderness.

Career 
In 1923, when Follett was only eight years old, she began writing The Adventures of Eepersip, later titled The House Without Windows, as a birthday present for her mother using a small portable typewriter she had been given. The story concerned a young girl, named Eepersip, who runs away from home and family to live happily in nature, complete with animal friends.  Though later that year her manuscript burned in a house fire, Follett rewrote the entire story and her father, an editor at the Knopf publishing house, supervised its publication in 1927. With the help and guidance of Follett's father, The House Without Windows was accepted and published in 1927 by Knopf to critical acclaim by The New York Times, the Saturday Review, and H. L. Mencken. Due to this early success, Barbara was hailed by some as a child genius.  Her opinion was sought out by radio stations and she was asked to review other children's books, such as Now We Are Six by British author A. A. Milne.

Follett's next novel, The Voyage of the Norman D., was based on her experience on a coastal schooner in Nova Scotia. It was published a year later in 1928, also receiving critical acclaim in many literary publications.

However, in the same year, Follett's father abandoned her mother for another woman. The event was a devastating blow to Follett, who was deeply attached to her father. Aged 14, she had reached the apex of her life and career.
  Subsequently, her family fell upon hard times. By the age of 16, as the Great Depression was deepening, Follett was working as a secretary in New York City. She wrote several more manuscripts, including the novel-length Lost Island and Travels Without a Donkey, a travelogue (the title plays on Robert Louis Stevenson's Travels with a Donkey).

Marriage
In the summer of 1931, Follett met Nickerson Rogers. The couple spent the summer of 1932 walking the Appalachian Trail from Katahdin to the Massachusetts border, then sailed to Spain where they continued their walking excursions in Mallorca and through the Swiss Alps. After settling in Brookline, Massachusetts, the couple married in July 1934. At this time, Barbara still wrote, but her work was no longer in favor with publishers. Although initially happy, by 1937 Barbara had started expressing dissatisfaction concerning married life in her letters to close friends, and by 1938 these cracks had widened even further. Follett soon came to believe that Rogers was being unfaithful to her and became depressed.

Disappearance 
According to her husband, on December 7, 1939, Follett left their apartment after a quarrel with $30 in her pocket ($589 in 2021). She was never seen again.

Rogers did not report Follett's disappearance to police for two weeks, claiming that he was waiting for her to return. Four months after notifying police, he requested a missing persons bulletin be issued. As the bulletin was issued under Follett's married name of "Rogers", it went unnoticed by the media, which did not learn of her disappearance until 1966.

In 1952, thirteen years after Follett disappeared, her mother Helen began insisting that Brookline Police investigate the matter more thoroughly. Helen had become suspicious of Rogers after she discovered that he had made little effort to find his wife. In a letter to Rogers, she wrote: "All of this silence on your part looks as if you had something to hide concerning Barbara's disappearance ... You cannot believe that I shall sit idle during my last few years and not make whatever effort I can to find out whether Bar is alive or dead, whether, perhaps, she is in some institution suffering from amnesia or nervous breakdown."

Follett's body was never found, and law enforcement did not find evidence either indicating or excluding foul play. The date and circumstances of her death were not established.

In 2019, writer Daniel Mills published a theory that Follett's body was found but was not identified as hers: After having conducted an investigation into several missing persons cases, Mills claimed to have found evidence that the body of Follett had been found in 1948, but the remains were mistakenly identified as those of another missing individual, Elsie Whittemore. According to him, the body was discovered on Pulsifer Hill, half a mile away from a farmhouse where Follett and Rogers had a long-standing rental agreement, and the possessions were in line with what she had, but the local police were unaware of her disappearance and had no record of it. The cause of death was determined to be a suicide, as a bottle containing barbiturate residue was found at the scene—it was known that Follett had been taking the substance.

Bibliography
The House Without Windows & Eepersip's Life There. New York and London: Knopf 1927.  (Reprinted 1968, New York: Avon Camelot.) (Reprinted 2019, London: Hamish Hamilton )
The Voyage of the Norman D.. New York and London: Knopf 1928. 
Lost Island (Plus Three Stories and an Afterword). Farksolia 2020

See also
List of people who disappeared

Notes
Citations

Further reading
Biaggio, Maryka (2021).The Point of Vanishing. Mechanicsburg, PA: Milford House Press.  

Hulbert, Ann (2018). Off the Charts. New York: Knopf. p. 400. 
Smith, Laura (2018). The Art of Vanishing. New York: Viking. p. 272. 
Schmeidler, Lynn (2018). History of Gone. El Paso, TX: Veliz Books. p. 85.

External links
Farksolia site with some of Follett's work maintained by Stefan Cooke, Follett's half-nephew
Astral Aviary: The Barbara Newhall Follett Archive 
Archived and current version of 2010 Vanishing Act article by Paul Collins at Lapham's Quarterly
March 4, 2014 – Barbara Newhall Follett's 100th Birthday by Stefan Cooke
The Child Genius Who Vanished: What Happened to Barbara Newhall Follett? 2016 article by Gary Sweeney
The Wunderkind Writer Who Disappeared Without a Trace at Age 25 2016 article by Abby Norman
The House Without Windows public domain e-book
Follett's archived papers at Columbia University Library
A Place of Vanishing: Barbara Newhall Follett and the Woman in the Woods 2019 article by Daniel Mills
 Finding aid to Barbara Newhall Follett papers at Columbia University. Rare Book & Manuscript Library.
 Finding aid to Helen Follett papers at Columbia University. Rare Book & Manuscript Library.

1914 births
1930s missing person cases
20th-century American novelists
20th-century American women writers
American child writers
American women novelists
Missing people
Missing person cases in Massachusetts
Novelists from New Hampshire
People from Hanover, New Hampshire
Year of death unknown
Brookline, Massachusetts
History of women in Massachusetts